Pehchaan (transl. Recognition) is a 1993 Indian Hindi-language action drama film directed by Deepak Shivdasani and co-produced by A.K. Abdul and Jeevat A.T. The film stars Sunil Shetty, Saif Ali Khan, Shilpa Shirodkar, Madhoo in pivotal roles. The film was a semi-hit at the Indian box office.

Plot 
Judge Jagdish Verma (Raza Murad) has an accused by Shankar Yogi (Kiran Kumar) in his courtroom. Judge Verma was once Shankar's defence lawyer, but now must pass a sentence against him. Shankar pleads his innocence, but the Judge finds him guilty and Shankar is sentenced for 7 years in jail. He swears to avenge this injustice and humiliation. Judge Verma's family consists of Urmila, his wife (Beena Banerjee), two sons, Kunal and Karan (Sunil Shetty and Saif Ali Khan respectively).

Shankar serves out his term and is released from jail, seeking revenge against Judge Verma and his family. He abducts Urmila who is pregnant to which her family doesn't know yet. He holds her captive for few months. Urmila gives birth to young Tina after Jagdish rejects her thinking that his wife is pregnant due to Shankar, who then plans to use Tina to destroy the judge and his family. The family is instructed not to contact the police, for the safety of Urmila and to keep this abduction a secret. Tina grows up in the company of Shankar and his men, without knowing her biological family. Tina is then used to ensnare the family into more deceit and entrapment under the direction of Shankar, leaving the Verma family no choice but to go along with Shankar's plan.

Cast
Sunil Shetty as Kunal Verma
Saif Ali Khan as Karan Verma
Shilpa Shirodkar as Seema Verma
Madhoo as Tina Verma
Raza Murad as Judge Jagdish Verma
Kiran Kumar as Shankar Yogi
Siddharth Ray as Robert
Avtar Gill as Veeru
Beena Banerjee as Urmila Verma

Soundtrack
The music was composed by Anand-Milind and written by Sameer. The songs were popular during the time the film was released.

References

External links 
 

1993 films
1990s Hindi-language films
Films scored by Anand–Milind
Films directed by Deepak Shivdasani
Indian action drama films